Jackson Callow (born 11 June 2002) is a professional Australian rules footballer who most recently played with the Hawthorn Football Club in the Australian Football League (AFL).

Early career

Jackson Callow is an Tasmanian who grew up in  Launceston. Callow first came to notice as a junior at Prospect Hawks Junior Football Club. He played in the Club's NTJFA U13 premiership in his first season (2015) and then captained the Hawks NTJFA U14 premiership team in 2016. Following another season at the Club and in the Tasmanian talent programs he was transferred to the Tasmanian State League. 

Thereafter Callow developed his craft playing for the North Launceston and the Tasmanian Devils. He was a member of the North Launceston team that won a Tasmanian State League flag in 2019.

In 2021 Callow made the journey across Bass Strait to Norwood and later spent the pre-season training with Hawthorn. He had hoped to get rookie drafted but was not selected. Callow accepted an offer from Norwood in South Australia where he lined up at centre half forward.

AFL career

Callow was selected with Pick 17 in the 2021 mid-season draft, having made an impression playing for Norwood in the SANFL during the first half of the 2021 SANFL season. The following week Callow lined up for Box Hill Hawks in the Victorian Football League where he played out the season.

In 2022 the well developed big man was rushed into the  side after injuries to the senior side's big men Ben McEvoy, Max Lynch and Ned Reeves. He was selected again the following week before being dropped back to Box Hill.

Statistics
Updated to the end of the 2022 season.

|-
| 2021 ||  || 45
| 0 || — || — || — || — || — || — || — || — || — || — || — || — || — || — || 0
|-
| 2022 ||  || 45
| 3 || 0 || 2 || 9 || 15 || 24 || 8 || 5 || 0.0 || 0.7 || 3.0 || 5.0 || 8.0 || 2.7 || 1.7 || 0
|- class="sortbottom"
! colspan=3| Career
! 3 !! 0 !! 2 !! 9 !! 15 !! 24 !! 8 !! 5 !! 0.0 !! 0.7 !! 3.0 !! 5.0 !! 8.0 !! 2.7 !! 1.7 !! 0
|}

References

External links

Living people
Australian rules footballers from Tasmania
2002 births
Hawthorn Football Club players
Box Hill Football Club players
Norwood Football Club players
North Launceston Football Club players